Alex K. Shalek is a biomedical engineer, and a core faculty member of the Institute for Medical Engineering and Science (IMES), an Associate Professor of Chemistry, and an Extramural Member of the Koch Institute for Integrative Cancer Research at the Massachusetts Institute of Technology.  Additionally, he is a Member of the Ragon Institute and an Institute Member of the Broad Institute, an Assistant in Immunology at Massachusetts General Hospital, and an Instructor in Health Sciences and Technology at Harvard Medical School.  The multi-disciplinary research of the Shalek Lab aims to create and implement broadly-applicable methods to study and engineer cellular responses in tissues, to drive biological discovery and improve prognostics, diagnostics, and therapeutics for autoimmune, infectious, and cancerous diseases. Shalek and his lab are best known for their work in single-cell genomics and for studying a number of devastating, but difficult to study, human diseases with partners around the world.

Education and previous research 
Shalek received his B.A. summa cum laude in 2004 from Columbia University where he studied chemical physics as a John Jay Scholar with Richard Bersohn and Louis Brus. He then performed graduate work in chemical physics developing arrays of nanowires as cellular "syringes" and electrochemical probes under the direction of Hongkun Park at Harvard University. After, as a postdoctoral fellow, under the direction of Park and Aviv Regev at the Broad Institute, Shalek helped pioneer single-cell patterns in cellular responses to study how cells respond differently to the same condition, showing that genome-wide gene expression covariation across cells could be used to define cellular types and states, their internal "circuitry", from the “bottom-up”.

As an independent investigator, Shalek and his lab have helped scale and simplify single cell genomics to study complex, low-input clinical specimens around the world. In parallel, they have used these and other approaches  to help examine the causes and consequences of cellular heterogeneity across cancers, infectious diseases, and inflammation.

Ongoing research 
Current work in the Shalek Lab includes both the development of broadly enabling technologies as well as their application to characterize, model, and  control multicellular systems. With respect to technology development, the lab brings together areas of research in genomics, chemical biology, and nanotechnology to establish accessible approaches to profile and control cells and their interactions.

In addition to these tools with the global research community, the lab is applying them to dissect human diseases, like COVID-19, methodically linking cellular features and clinical observations. Major areas of focus include how: immune cells coordinate balanced responses to environmental stresses; host cell-pathogen interactions evolve during infection; and, tumor cells evade therapeutic treatment and natural immunity.

From these observations and those of others, the lab aims to understand how disease alters tissue function at the cellular level and realize therapeutic and prophylactic interventions to reestablish or support human health.

Select honors and awards 
2019-20 Harold E. Edgerton  Faculty Achievement Award 2020

Young Mentor Award, Harvard Medical School, 2020

Pew-Stewart Scholar, Pew Charitable Trust  Charitable Trust, 2018 – 2022

Sloan Research Fellow in Chemistry, Alfred P. Sloan Foundation, 2018 – 2020

Pfizer-Laubach Career Development Professorship, MIT, 2017 – 2020

Associate Scientific Advisor, Science Translational Medicine, 2016

NIH Director's New Innovator Award, 2015 – 2020

Beckman Young Investigators Award Arnold and Mabel Beckman Foundation, 2015 – 2019

Searle Scholars Program, Kinship Foundation, 2015 – 2018

"Follow That Cell” Competition First Place (team member), NIH, 2015

Hermann L.F. von Helmholtz Career Development Professorship, MIT, 2014 – 2016

Excellence Award, Broad Institute of Harvard and MIT, 2013

Dudley R. Herschbach Teaching Award, Harvard University, 2006

Graduate Research Fellowship, NSF, 2005 – 2008

Certificate of Distinction in Teaching, Harvard University, 2005

Phi Beta Kappa, Columbia University, 2004

John Jay Scholar, Columbia University, 2000 – 2004

Select publications 
Huang, Siyi et al. (2021-01-21). "Lymph nodes are innervated by a unique population of sensory neurons with immunomodulatory potential". Cell. 184 (2): 441–459.e25
Ziegler, C.G.K. et al. (2020-05-28). “SARS-CoV-2 receptor ACE2 is an interferon-stimulated gene in human airway epithelial cells and is detected in specific cell subsets across tissues,” Cell, 181, 1016 (2020).
Hughes, Travis K. et al. (2020-10-13). "Second-Strand Synthesis-Based Massively Parallel scRNA-Seq Reveals Cellular States and Molecular Features of Human Inflammatory Skin Pathologies". Immunity. 53 (4): 878–894.e7.
Kotliar, Dylan et al. (2020-11-25). "Single-Cell Profiling of Ebola Virus Disease In Vivo Reveals Viral and Host Dynamics". Cell. 183 (5): 1383–1401.e19.
Kazer, Samuel W. et al. (2020-04). "Integrated single-cell analysis of multicellular immune dynamics during hyperacute HIV-1 infection". Nature Medicine. 26 (4): 511–518.
 Smillie, C.# et al. (2019). “Intra- and inter-cellular rewiring of the human colon during ulcerative colitis” Cell, 178, 714 (2019).
 Ordovas-Montanes, J. et al. (2018). “Reduced cellular diversity and an altered basal progenitor cell state inform epithelial barrier dysfunction in human type 2 immunity,” Nature, 560, 649 (2018).
Martin-Gayo, E. et al. (2018). “A Rational Framework for Modulating Ensemble Immune Behaviors Inspired by HIV-1 Elite Control”, Genome Biol., 19, 10 (2018).
 T. M. Gierahn et al. (2017) “Seq-Well: A Portable, Low-cost Platform for Single-Cell RNA-Seq of Low-Input Samples.” Nature Meth. 14 (2017): 395.
 I. Tirosh et al. (2017) “Dissecting the multicellular ecosystem of metastatic melanoma by single-cell RNA-seq.” Science 352.6282 (2016): 189-96.
 E. Z. Macosko et al. (2015). “Genome-wide expression profiling of thousands of individual cells using nanoliter droplets.” Cell 161 (2015): 1202-14.
 A. K. Shalek et al. (2014). “Large-Scale Single-Cell RNA-Seq Reveals Strategies for Regulating Cell-to-Cell Dynamic Variability through Paracrine Signaling.” Nature 510 (2014): 363.
 A. K. Shalek et al. (2013). “Single-Cell Transcriptomics Reveals Bimodality in Expression and Splicing in Immune Cells.” Nature 498 (2013): 236-40.
 N. Yosef et al. (2013). “Dynamic Regulatory Network Controlling Th17 Cell Differentiation.” Nature 496 (2013): 461-68.

References

External links 

Biomedical engineers
Columbia College (New York) alumni
Massachusetts Institute of Technology School of Science faculty
Harvard University faculty
Broad Institute people
Living people
American scientists
1981 births
Massachusetts General Hospital people
People from California
Sloan Research Fellows